George Michael Decker Hahn (November 24, 1830 – March 15, 1886), was an attorney, politician, publisher and planter in New Orleans, Louisiana. He served twice in Congress during two widely separated periods, elected first as a Unionist Democratic Congressman in 1862, as a Republican to the U.S. Senate in 1865, and later as a Republican to the U.S. House of Representatives in 1884. He was elected as the 19th Governor of Louisiana, serving from 1864 to 1865 during the American Civil War, when the state was occupied by Union troops. He was the first German-born governor in the United States, and is also claimed as the first ethnic Jewish governor. By that time he was a practicing Episcopalian.

In 1865, Hahn was elected to the U.S. Senate, but Radical Republicans refused to allow him and other Southerners to be seated. Later he was elected for several terms as a Republican to the state House during the Reconstruction era, where he was also elected as Speaker. Hahn was active as a publisher and editor, owning and operating three newspapers in succession that supported the Republican Party, its program, and its candidates in the state. He spent much of his wealth in supporting these papers. Hahn continued to be politically active, being elected to Congress from Louisiana's 2nd congressional district in 1884 with a strong majority. He served about a year before his death in office.

Early life and education

Hahn was born in 1830 as the last child in his family, in Klingenmünster, Palatinate, then part of the Kingdom of Bavaria, now of Rhineland-Palatinate, Germany. His father died before he was born. Some sources indicate that Hahn's parents were Jewish.

With his widowed mother and four older siblings, Hahn immigrated as a child to the United States, arriving in New York City. The family traveled to the Republic of Texas, before settling in New Orleans in 1840. The following year, Hahn's mother died of yellow fever and the children were orphaned. With the help of his older siblings, Hahn continued his education and graduated from City High School. In 1849 at the age of 19, he began reading law under Christian Roselius, a prominent Whig attorney and later Attorney General of Louisiana. In 1851, Hahn graduated from the University of Louisiana (Tulane University) with a law degree. He worked in Roselius' office after getting his degree.

Political career
The following year Hahn was elected to the New Orleans city school board at the age of 22; he ran the school system as its director.  He joined the Democratic party faction led by Pierre Soulé. In the Presidential Election of 1860, Hahn supported Stephen Douglas. He was fluent in English, French and German.

In 1860 Hahn opposed secession, delivering a pro-Union speech in Lafayette Square. He avoided taking an oath of allegiance to the Confederacy. Opposed to secession and a supporter of the Union, Hahn was elected in 1862 as a Republican and the U.S. representative from Louisiana's 2nd congressional district. This incorporated most of New Orleans, which had been occupied by Union forces.

Hahn was one of two Louisiana Representatives seated in the 37th Congress, which adjourned on March 4, 1863, during the Civil War. Eventually, Hahn advised that there should be no more representation from Louisiana until it was "reconstructed." During his time in Washington, Hahn met and befriended President Abraham Lincoln.

Term as governor

In 1864, with almost all of Louisiana under federal occupation, General Nathaniel P. Banks, the Union Military Commander of the Department of the Gulf (responsible, among other things, for civil order in occupied Louisiana), called state elections and convened a constitutional convention. Benjamin Franklin Flanders and Thomas Jefferson Durant, prominent Unionists, opposed the moderate plan called for by General Banks.  Hahn purchased a pro-slavery newspaper, the New Orleans True Delta, and used it to promote moderate Unionism supporting Banks' plan, including emancipation of slaves.  Hahn ran for Governor for the Free-State Party and won the election with 54% or 11,411 votes. J. Q. A. Fellows, a conservative Democrat, received 26% or 2,996 votes; and Benjamin Franklin Flanders, the radical Republican, received 20% or 2,232 votes.

Hahn was elected as the first German-born governor of an American state. He is also claimed as the first ethnic Jewish governor in the United States; by then he was worshipping as an Episcopalian.

On March 4, 1864, Hahn was inaugurated as Governor of Union-held Louisiana in an elaborate ceremony paid for by General Banks. As governor, Hahn supported universal education.

In his term, Hahn tried to gain suffrage for freedmen and previously free people of color, but it was too early. He approved the state's ratification of the 15th Amendment.  Hahn's administration made serious attempts to ensure enfranchisement of black Louisianans, laid the foundation for a public school system for blacks, and began an aborted Reconstruction in Louisiana. Governor Hahn played a leading role in the state constitutional convention of 1864, but he was opposed by Major General Stephen A. Hurlbut, who replaced Banks as commander of the Department of the Gulf. General Hurlburt refused to recognize the state civil government of Hahn.

Hahn resigned as governor in March 1865, and was elected by the state legislature to the U.S. Senate in 1865. However, Radical Republicans did not seat him, as they believed the state had more work to do before being allowed to rejoin the Union.

Lieutenant Governor James Madison Wells succeeded Hahn as governor after his resignation.

Political editor and congressman
After President Lincoln was assassinated in April 1865, Congress refused to seat any Representatives or Senators from the South until a reconstruction plan could be carried out.  Senator-elect Hahn returned to New Orleans and allied with radical Republicans calling for a convention to revise Louisiana's Constitution of 1864 to include black suffrage. He was shot and severely wounded on July 30, 1866, in the New Orleans Riot.

In 1867 Hahn became editor and manager of the New Orleans Republican newspaper, his platform for opposing President Andrew Johnson's lenient Reconstruction program. In 1872 Hahn retired to a plantation in St. Charles Parish. There he established the village of Hahnville and published his third newspaper, the St. Charles Herald. On his plantation, he grew sugar cane, the common commodity crop in the "sugar parishes" of this region.

From 1871 to 1878 Hahn served in the Louisiana State Legislature. He was elected as Chairman of the Judiciary Committee and Speaker of the House. In 1878 he was appointed as Superintendent of the U.S. Mint in New Orleans, serving until January 1879. At that point, Hahn was appointed Judge of the 26th state judicial district, which included Saint John the Baptist, Saint Charles, and Jefferson parishes. During the 1880 elections, Hahn established and edited the New Orleans Ledger to promote Republican candidates.

Although Democrats had regained control of the state legislature, Hahn was personally admired for his integrity and consistency of position. In 1884 Hahn was elected to Congress as the Republican candidate from Louisiana's 2nd congressional district – a race which he won handily by 3,000 votes. Serving as the only Republican Congressman from Louisiana, Hahn died on March 15, 1886, in his room at the Willard Hotel in Washington, D.C. He suffered a ruptured blood vessel near his heart. His body was returned to New Orleans.

Hahn's funeral was conducted by an Episcopal priest, and he was buried in New Orleans' Metairie Cemetery. He had never married and died poor. He had spent much of his previous wealth in trying to maintain the Republican-oriented newspapers he published.

Notes

See also
List of United States Congress members who died in office (1790–1899)
List of U.S. state governors born outside the United States

 New Orleans massacre of 1866

References
Congressional Biography
Baker, Vaughn B., and Amos E. Simpson. "Michael Hahn: Steady Patriot" Louisiana History 13 (summer 1972): pp. 229–52.

External links

Michael Hahn's Congressional biography
Cemetery Memorial by La-Cemeteries

1830 births
1886 deaths
People from Südliche Weinstraße
German emigrants to the United States
Governors of Louisiana
Speakers of the Louisiana House of Representatives
Democratic Party members of the Louisiana House of Representatives
Tulane University alumni
Politicians from New Orleans
Businesspeople from New Orleans
People from Hahnville, Louisiana
Editors of Louisiana newspapers
Louisiana Unionists
People from the Palatinate (region)
Unionist Party members of the United States House of Representatives
Republican Party members of the United States House of Representatives from Louisiana
Republican Party governors of Louisiana
Unionist Party state governors of the United States
School board members in Louisiana
19th-century American politicians
American lawyers admitted to the practice of law by reading law
19th-century American businesspeople